Macalla noctuipalpis is a species of snout moth in the genus Macalla. It was described by Paul Dognin in 1908, and is known from Venezuela (including Maracay), Argentina (including Tucumán) and Brazil.

References

Moths described in 1908
Epipaschiinae